The Last Mile (TLM) provides in-prison technology education and post-incarceration mentorship to justice-involved people across the United States. The organization, a 501(c)(3) nonprofit, originated in 2010 at San Quentin State Prison, California, United States with the California Department of Corrections and Rehabilitation, and works with state-level correctional facilities for men, women, and youth. The Last Mile’s mission is to reduce the rate of recidivism in the US by teaching marketable skills inside prisons, helping participants qualify for and secure gainful employment after incarceration. Six states have active partnerships with The Last Mile (California, Indiana, Kansas, Oklahoma, Michigan, and North Dakota).

History

The Last Mile began on December 18, 2010 as a result of Chris Redlitz and Beverly Parenti visiting a business class at San Quentin State Prison. The program was founded to address the rate of recidivism in America by empowering people who are incarcerated with the skills needed to succeed in today’s job market.

Entrepreneurship

The Last Mile was initially modeled as a pro bono startup accelerator inside San Quentin with restrictions imposed to meet prison security protocols. With mentorship from Redlitz and Parenti, each participant conceptualized a business, developed a business plan, and prepared a business pitch. In May 2012, the inaugural TLM Demo Day was held at San Quentin State Prison with six program graduates pitching their startup ideas in front of 350+ business and tech C-Suite executives, entrepreneurs, government officials, and news organizations.

Computer Coding

In 2014, The Last Mile launched its coding program, the first fully inclusive computer programming curriculum available in a US prison, in partnership with the California Prison Industry Authority. Code.3730 was implemented at San Quentin as a career training program with the goal of teaching students to become software engineers, improving their opportunities for self-sustaining employment when they returned home. It has since evolved to become The Last Mile’s Web Development program.

Expansion
After launching at San Quentin State Prison, The Last Mile continued expanding amongst California’s correctional facilities for men, women, and youth. In 2018, The Last Mile launched in Indiana and has since expanded to Oklahoma, Kansas, and Michigan. The Last Mile focuses on implementing its program at the state level with a combination of public and private funding.

Locations

Programs

TLM utilizes a custom-built remote instruction software and Learning Management System (LMS) to deliver educational programming into correctional facilities across the country. The organization’s staff creates and delivers course content with coordination support from classroom facilitators, who oversee students’ daily activity in person. 

In-Prison Education

 Web Development Program -- A 12 month coding program in which students learn full stack software engineering using a platform that simulates the internet. The course curriculum includes web development fundamentals, such as HTML, CSS, JavaScript, jQuery, and Bootstrap, as well as MERN, a software stack that includes four open-source technologies: MongoDB, Express.js, React, and Node.js. 

Reentry Mentorship

 Career development -- Support in areas such as resume writing, interview prep, and soft skill building. 
 Job placement support -- Connections to apprenticeship and employment opportunities, as well job search assistance.
 Alumni community -- Access to TLM’s network of alumni who share and discuss common obstacles and goals in the reentry process, particularly relating to career development.

Impact 
Second-Chance Hiring

The Last Mile is regarded by advocates of both prison reform and workplace diversity, as the program's results have proven to reduce recidivism and mobilize nontraditional career pathways. After decades of incarceration, alumni have been hired by Slack, GoodRx, Zoom, Dropbox, Adobe, the Chan Zuckerberg Initiative (CZI), VMware, Fandom, and Checkr, among other companies, after becoming qualified full stack developers through TLM's in-prison program.

Media coverage

The program has been covered in Reuters, The Atlantic, BBC News, ReadWriteWeb, TechCrunch, and other newspapers and magazines.

The program was also discussed by Neil Cavuto in his TV show for the Fox Business Network.

References

External links
 

San Quentin State Prison
United States educational programs
2011 establishments in California